StoryMill (originally Avenir) is a text editor designed for fiction writers. It provides scene, chapter and character management capabilities along with the ability to annotate text and a claimed industry-first timeline view.

Avenir was developed by Todd Ransom, of Return Self Software, who also developed Montage, a Mac screenwriting application, for Mariner Software. From version 3, Avenir is being "republished" by Mariner, as StoryMill.

References

External links
 

2011 software
MacOS text editors
MacOS-only software
Text editors
Personal information managers